The Butterfly Lion is a children's novel by Michael Morpurgo. It was first published in Great Britain by Collins in 1996, and won the 1996 Smarties book prize. The book was adapted into a stage play by Daniel Buckroyd of the Mercury Theatre, Colchester, which toured the UK in 2014.

Plot summary

A young boy named Michael runs away from a boarding school and meets an old lady living in a big cottage.  She tells him about a boy named Bertie who lived in South Africa. As a boy, Bertie had found an orphaned white lion cub, but was eventually forced to send the lion away to the circus and leave South Africa to attend boarding school in Wiltshire, England.

Bertie escapes from his school and meets Millie, and the two become fast friends, flying kites together.  He tells Millie all about his life in South Africa, and his white lion cub. When the pair leave school, they continue to write until war breaks out, and a letter arrives from Bertie informing Millie that he has joined the army.

Later, when fighting in France in the First World War, he saves two men's lives and is given a Victoria Cross.  Millie, who has become a nurse in the hopes of finding Bertie, reads about him in a newspaper and the two are reunited.  Together they discover that Monsieur Merlot's circus has closed down, but that the Frenchman lives nearby with the lion.

Bertie marries Millie and brings the lion back to England, where they live happily for many years. When the lion dies, Bertie and Millie carve a lion out of the chalk in the hillside in memorial, before Bertie dies himself.

After being told the story, Michael returns to school. He finds a plaque commemorating Bertie's heroic acts in the war, and learns from a teacher that Millie died only a few months after Bertie. Michael goes back to the house, finding it deserted. He then hears Millie's voice asking him to look after the chalk lion on the hill.

References

1996 British novels
British children's novels
Novels set in Wiltshire
Novels by Michael Morpurgo
Children's novels about animals
1996 children's books
Books about lions
British children's books
HarperCollins books